Dominik Budzyński (born 2 June 1992) is a Polish professional footballer who plays as a goalkeeper.

Club career
On 14 August 2020, he signed a one-year contract with Sandecja Nowy Sącz.

References

1992 births
People from Lubartów
Sportspeople from Lublin Voivodeship
Living people
Polish footballers
Poland youth international footballers
Association football goalkeepers
Polonia Warsaw players
Radomiak Radom players
Miedź Legnica players
Śląsk Wrocław players
ŁKS Łódź players
Sandecja Nowy Sącz players
OKS Stomil Olsztyn players
Ekstraklasa players
I liga players
II liga players
III liga players